Manuel Cominotto (born 18 December 1990) is an Italian male long-distance runner, who won an Italian championships in 2015.

National titles
 Italian Athletics Championships
 10 km road: 2015

References

External links
 

1990 births
Living people
Italian male long-distance runners
Athletics competitors of Gruppo Sportivo Esercito